Patrick van Deurzen (Eindhoven, 27 January 1964) is a Dutch composer.

Biography 

Patrick Deurzen studied guitar with Dick Hoogeveen and Music Theory with Peter-Jan Wagemans and Jan Kleinbussink at the Rotterdam Conservatory. As a composer he is self-taught but attended classes of instrumentation Klaas de Vries with whom he has had regular work meetings. He also received some composition lessons from Wagemans. He worked as a guitarist, conductor, singer and wrote several articles on 20th-century music. He also worked on several documentaries for the NPS, which include Schoenberg's Moses and Aaron and Alban Berg s violin concerto. Currently he is active as a composer and teaches at the Royal Conservatory in The Hague and Codarts Rotterdam.

The idea that Pavlovian association is a feature that makes man unique is the starting point of Van Deurzens composing. Deurzen also often adds text that the musicians should recite to add a different level of meaning to the composition, as in his quintet Choral, Prelude & Fugue (2005) where each part contains texts of Don Quixote. In 2002 he won the Second international composition competition for choral music in Hasselt (Belgium), Deux poèmes the Baudelaire for a cappella choir, conducted by the Flemish Radio Choir.

Compositions

 Tornado (2011, Orchestra. Strings, 2 oboes, 2 horns)
 Monologue (2011, Cello)
Turris Babel (2010, Female quintet, stones, sticks and water; text from Athanasius Kircher and the Bible)
Three Songs (2010, Singer, Guitar; Poems by Marianne Grootenboer)
 Improvising on Bach's Prelude in C minor (2009, Piano)
 Love Song (2009, Male quintet and string quartet)
 Turris Babel (2009, pre-study, Female quintet)
 Les Tènébres (2008, Voice, piano and optional film; text from Baudelaire)
 Wahnbrot, sechs chorstücke nach Paul Celan (2008, Mixed choir)
 If I were God (2007, Mixed choir with viola and cello; text by Astrid Lindgren)
 Thank God Sylvia! We're alive! (2007, Orchestra. Strings and Percussion)
 Geheime Tuin (Secret Garden, poems by Hendrik de Vries) (2007, Two soprano's, soprano-/altsax, harmonium, percussion)
 Seven (2006,  String quartet)
 ceux qui sont venus du ciel (2006, A-clarinet)
 Six: a line is a dot that went for a walk (2006, Flugelhorn, Percussion, Double bas)
 Choral, Fugue e Prelude (2005, Wind quintet)
 Eight scenes from Alice (2005, Female choir, percussion)
 Langs de Randen van de Nacht (Past the edges of the night) (2005, Horn, Strings, harp, percussion)
 Three (2005, Violin, Horn, percussion)
 Duo (2002, Clarinet, Oboe)
 Cantigas d'amor (2001, Singer, Piano)
 Four solo's for Bass clarinet (2001, Bass clarinet)
 Deux poèmes de Baudelaire (2001, Mixed choir)

External links 
Patrick van Deurzen Donemus 
Website Patrick van Deurzen 
Muziek Centrum Nederland (gearchiveerd)
Concertzender: Strijkkwartet no 1. "Seven" performed by the DoelenKwartet 
Referential Networks. Research paper Patrick van Deurzen

1964 births
Living people
Dutch composers
Musicians from Eindhoven
Codarts University for the Arts alumni
Academic staff of the Royal Conservatory of The Hague